Singing Valentines is the name for a fundraising program that is popular with barbershop choruses in the U.S., Canada and Australia.
The delivery of Singing Valentines is usually done by a barbershop quartet from a chapter affiliated with the three major International barbershop societies:
 Barbershop Harmony Society
 Sweet Adelines International
 Harmony, Incorporated

Note that this is not really a variation on the singing telegram, since the message detail is not dictated by the sender.
Rather, quartets usually deliver a canned package of one or two barbershop songs with a personalized card and either roses or chocolates.

Song selection
Each chapter is free to choose their own music.  For male barbershop chapters, the typical two song selection is:
 Heart of My Heart, I Love You (the chorus from the Story of the Rose), and
 Let Me Call You Sweetheart
There are standard barbershop arrangements for these two songs from the Barbershop Harmony Society collection of twelve polecat songs (that society members are encouraged to learn).

The female barbershop societies do not suggest particular songs for chapters to use in this fundraiser.

Logistics
Some of the larger choruses are able to field enough quartets to deliver as many as 200 Singing Valentines in two days, usually on the February 13 and 14.  Often, deliveries to assisted living facilities or nursing homes can be scheduled for the weekend.

Other Singing Valentines
Although the delivery of Singing Valentines is typically done by a barbershop quartet, other a cappella singing ensembles have been known to set up similar fundraising programs, particularly on college campuses.

Since 2011, on every Feb. 14, Canadian bilingual magazine La Scena Musicale / The Music Scene offers an annual Singing Valentines, a unique romantic one-to-one experience delivered by trained solo opera singers at the request of the sender to his or her loved one. This Valentine's Day gift is now done by telephone, personalized recorded video or other video and audio platforms such as Zoom and Facetime; different genres are performed, ranging from opera arias to standard love songs to musicals and art songs. During the COVID-19 pandemic, La Scena Musicale has extended the service to CORONA Serenades and Mother's Day serenades. 

There is a reference to Singing Valentines in chapter thirteen of Harry Potter and the Chamber of Secrets.

See also
 A cappella music

Notes and references

External links
 Quartets sing to your heart's desire on Valentine's Day, Star Bulletin, February 7, 2006
 To Horseheads with love, from Okinawa , Star Gazette, March 12, 2008

Barbershop music
Fundraising